
Gmina Pniewy is a rural gmina (administrative district) in Grójec County, Masovian Voivodeship, in east-central Poland. Its seat is the village of Pniewy, which lies approximately 10 kilometres (6 mi) north-west of Grójec and 40 km (25 mi) south-west of Warsaw.

Villages 
Gmina Pniewy contains the villages and settlements of Aleksandrów, Budki Petrykowskie, Ciechlin, Cychry, Dąbrówka, Daszew, Ginetówka, Jeziora, Jeziora-Nowina, Jeziórka, Józefów, Jurki, Karolew, Kocerany, Kolonia Jurki, Konie, Kornelówka, Kruszew, Kruszewek, Michrów, Michrów-Stefów, Michrówek, Natalin, Nowina-Przęsławice, Osieczek, Pniewy, Przęsławice, Przykory, Rosołów, Teodorówka, Wiatrowiec, Wilczoruda, Wilczoruda-Parcela, Witalówka, Wola Grabska, Wola Pniewska, Wólka Załęska and Załęże Duże.

Neighbouring gminas
Gmina Pniewy is bordered by the gminas of Belsk Duży, Błędów, Grójec, Mszczonów, Tarczyn and Żabia Wola.

References 
 Polish official population figures 2006

Pniewy
Gmina Pniewy